René Sédillot (2 November 1906 – 21 October 1999) was a French journalist and historian.<ref name=IndepObit>Douglas Johnson, Obituary: René Sédillot', The Independent, 3 December 1999.</ref>

Life
Born in Orléans, Sédillot was educated in Paris. He  worked for the financial press, joining  L'Information Boursiere in 1928 and becoming editor until the paper folded in 1940. In 1945 he became editor of the weekly La Vie francaise (later renamed La Vie financiere).

Works
 Survol de l'histoire du monde, 1949. Translated by Gerard Hopkins as A birds-eye view of world history, 1951. Also published as The history of the world in three hundred pages, 1951
 An outline of French history, 1952. Translated from the French by Gerard Hopkins.
 '''Survol de l'histoire de France, 1955.
 Histoire des colonisations [History of colonizations], 1958.
 Paris, 1962
 (with Franz Pick) All the monies of the world: a chronicle of currency values, 1971
 Histoire du petrole, Paris, 1974
 Le coût de la Révolution française'' [The cost of the French Revolution], 1986
”L’Histoire n’a pas de sens” [History Has No Sense], Paris, 1965

References

External links 
 René Sédillot: Le coût de la révolution française video

Writers from Orléans
1906 births
1999 deaths
Lycée Henri-IV alumni
20th-century French journalists
Economic historians
20th-century French historians
French male writers
Winners of the Prix Broquette-Gonin (literature)
Officiers of the Légion d'honneur
20th-century French essayists